Thomas Grady VC DCM (18 September 1835 – 18 May 1891) was born in Claddagh, County Galway and was an Irish recipient of the Victoria Cross, the highest and most prestigious award for gallantry in the face of the enemy that can be awarded to British and Commonwealth forces.

Details
He was 19 years old, and a private in the 4th Regiment of Foot (later The King's Own (Royal Lancaster) Regiment), British Army during the Crimean War when the following deed took place for which he was awarded the VC.

On 18 October 1854 at Sebastopol, the Crimea, Private Grady volunteered to repair the embrasures of the Sailors' Battery on the Left Attack and carried out this task under very heavy fire from a line of batteries. On 22 November during the repulse of a Russian attack, although severely wounded, Private Grady refused to leave the front and his example encouraged the weak force which was engaging the enemy to maintain their position.

Further information
He emigrated to Australia and died in South Melbourne, Victoria on 18 May 1891.  Grady is buried in Melbourne General Cemetery.

Some references incorrectly state he was promoted sergeant. He was discharged as a private, his award was gazetted as a private and his pension was paid as a private.

The medal
His Victoria Cross is displayed at the Australian War Memorial (Canberra, Australia).

References

Listed in order of publication year 
The Register of the Victoria Cross (1981, 1988 and 1997)

Ireland's VCs  (Dept of Economic Development, 1995)
Monuments to Courage (David Harvey, 1999)
Irish Winners of the Victoria Cross (Richard Doherty & David Truesdale, 2000)
Royal Lancaster Museum

1835 births
1891 deaths
19th-century Irish people
Crimean War recipients of the Victoria Cross
British Army personnel of the Crimean War
Irish recipients of the Victoria Cross
Recipients of the Distinguished Conduct Medal
People from County Galway
King's Own Royal Regiment soldiers
Irish soldiers in the British Army
Irish emigrants to colonial Australia
British Army recipients of the Victoria Cross
Burials at Melbourne General Cemetery